Software law refers to the legal remedies available to protect software-based assets. Software may, under various circumstances and in various countries, be restricted by patent or copyright or both. Most commercial software is sold under some kind of software license agreement.

See also 
 Legal aspects of computing
 Software copyright
 Software patent
 Software license
 Software license agreement
 Proprietary software
 Free and open source software